is a private junior college in Chikugo, Fukuoka, Japan, established in 1970. The predecessor of the school was founded in 1965.

External links
 Official website

Educational institutions established in 1965
Private universities and colleges in Japan
Universities and colleges in Fukuoka Prefecture
Japanese junior colleges
1965 establishments in Japan